Mount Lester Pearson is a  mountain located in the Premier Range of the Cariboo Mountains in the east-central interior of British Columbia, Canada.

The name honours the fourteenth Prime Minister of Canada and 1957 recipient of the Nobel Peace Prize, Lester Pearson, who died in 1972. The mountain was officially named after Pearson in 1973.

References

Three-thousanders of British Columbia
Cariboo Mountains
Cariboo Land District